Victor Hall may refer to:

 Victor Hall (footballer) (1886–1966), English footballer
 Victor E. Hall (1901–1981), Canadian physiologist
 Victor W. Hall, American admiral
 Victor Hall (American football) (born 1968), American football player
 Vic Hall (novelist) (Victor Charles Hall, 1896–1972), Australian novelist and biographer

See also
 Thomas Victor Hall (1879–1965), American illustrator, painter and sculptor
 Vic Hall (Vicqual Renee Hall, born 1986), American football player